Improper Channels is a Canadian comedy-drama film, directed by Eric Till and released in 1981.

The film stars Alan Arkin as an architect named Jeff Martley, and Mariette Hartley as his estranged wife Diana. After their daughter Nancy is mildly injured in a car accident, an overzealous social worker (Monica Parker) wrongly accuses him of child abuse, and takes custody of the child away.

The film received four Genie Award nominations at the 3rd Genie Awards in 1982, for Best Foreign Actor (Arkin), Best Foreign Actress (Hartley), Best Original Screenplay (Adam Arkin, Morrie Ruvinsky and Ian Sutherland) and Best Art Direction/Production Design (Ninkey Dalton and Charles Dunlop). Arkin won the award for Best Foreign Actor.

Cast
 Alan Arkin as Jeffrey Martley
 Mariette Hartley as Diana Martley
 Monica Parker as Gloria Washburn
 Harry Ditson as Harold Clevish
 Sarah Stevens as Nancy Martley
 Danny Higham as Jack
 Leslie Yeo as Fred
 Richard W. Farrell as Fraser
 Ruth Springford as Mrs. Wharton
 Martin Yan as Hu
 Tony Rosato as Dr. Arpenthaler
 Philip Akin as Cop
 Harvey Atkin as Sergeant
 Richard Blackburn as Fraser's Assistant
 Eugene Clark as Security Guard #1

References

External links
 

1981 films
English-language Canadian films
1981 comedy-drama films
1981 independent films
Canadian comedy-drama films
Canadian independent films
Crown International Pictures films
Films about children
Films about couples
Films about families
Films about miscarriage of justice
Films directed by Eric Till
Films scored by Maribeth Solomon
Films scored by Micky Erbe
Films set in hospitals
1980s English-language films
1980s Canadian films